Yuanhui District is a district of the city of Luohe, Henan province, China.

Administrative divisions
As 2012, this district is divided to 4 subdistricts, 1 town and 3 townships.
Subdistricts

Towns
Daliu

Townships
Kongzhongguo Township
Wenshi Township
Yinyangzhao Township

References

County-level divisions of Henan
Luohe